Eriocnemis is a genus of hummingbirds, which - together with the species in the genus Haplophaedia - are known as pufflegs. They occur in humid forest, woodland and shrub at altitudes of 1000 to 4800 m. asl in the Andes of Argentina, Bolivia, Peru, Ecuador, Colombia, and Venezuela. The males have a colourful green, coppery or blue plumage, and the females are generally somewhat duller. The most striking feature of both sexes in the genus Eriocnemis are their dense snow-white leg-puffs which consist of feather tufts that resemble woolly panties. One species, the black-thighed puffleg - is characterized by black coloured leg-puffs. Most have a contrasting blue, purple or coppery-red vent, but this is green in the black-thighed and emerald-bellied puffleg. Further common features of all species are the straight black bill and the slightly to deeply forked tail. The genus name was coined by the German naturalist Ludwig Reichenbach who called them Snowy panties.

While most members of this genus remain fairly common, three species (colorful puffleg, black-breasted puffleg and gorgeted puffleg) are critically endangered and one (the turquoise-throated puffleg) is possibly extinct.

Species
The genus contains 11 species:
 Black-breasted puffleg, Eriocnemis nigrivestis
 Gorgeted puffleg, Eriocnemis isabellae
 Glowing puffleg, Eriocnemis vestita
 Black-thighed puffleg, Eriocnemis derbyi
 Turquoise-throated puffleg, Eriocnemis godini - possibly extinct (20th century?)
 Coppery-bellied puffleg, Eriocnemis cupreoventris
 Sapphire-vented puffleg, Eriocnemis luciani
 Coppery-naped puffleg, Eriocnemis (luciani) sapphiropygia
 Golden-breasted puffleg, Eriocnemis mosquera
 Blue-capped puffleg, Eriocnemis glaucopoides
 Colorful puffleg, Eriocnemis mirabilis
 Emerald-bellied puffleg, Eriocnemis aline

In addition there were the controversial species: Eriocnemis söderströmi, E. isaacsoni and E. dyselius which were each only known by one specimen. In the case of E. söderströmi it could have been either the female of E. godini or a hybrid between E. luciani and E. nigrivestris. E. dyselius was nothing more than a melanistic individual of E. cupreoventris. Today these species are considered invalid.

References

 Heynen, I. (1999). Genus Eriocnemis. pp. 639–641 in: del Hoyo, J., Elliott, A., & Sargatal, J. eds. (1999). Handbook of the Birds of the World. Vol. 5. Barn-owls to Hummingbirds. Lynx Edicions, Barcelona. 
 Systematics and biogeography of the Andean genus Eriocnemis (Aves: Trochilidae) (Abstract)

 
Bird genera
 
Taxa named by Ludwig Reichenbach